"Ante Gia" (Greek: Άντε Γειά; English: Goodbye) is an EP maxi single by Greek singer Despina Vandi released on December 19, 2002 by Heaven Music. The entire EP was written and produced by Phoebus in promotion of the reissue of Vandi's 5× Platinum album Gia, which was reissued as Gia + Ante Gia and as a box set as Gia + Ante Gia: Collector's Edition. The EP contains all new material, with the title track being a response to the single "Gia" (Hello), inspired by that song but in a negative lyrical context. The remix of the songs "Spania" and "Giatriko" is licensed by Vandi's former label Minos EMI.

Track listing

Singles
"Simera"
The first single from the EP was "Simera", a dance-pop song that was later rewritten in English as "C'est La Vie" for the international release of the album in 2003. The music video was directed by Kostas Kapetanidis and features Vandi in five different scenes dressed up in different costumes, in front of solid color backgrounds, doing things such as writing on the walls and playing electric guitar. Towards the end her four personas meet in one scene, with the video ending showing speeding cars on a highway.

"I Melodia Tis Monaxias"
The second single was "I Melodia Tis Monaxias". The music video was once again directed by Kapetanidis. In it, Vandi is involved in a car accident and presumably killed. She wanders around, having in an out-of-body experience, before finally being revived at the end.

Chart performance
Ante Gia peaked at number one on the Greek Singles Chart (where EPs chart in Greece).  The EP was certified double platinum, recognizing shipments of at least 40,000 units.

Credits and personnel

Personnel
Demos Beke - background vocals, second vocals
Antonis Gounaris - guitars (electrics, acoustics, twelve-strings), orchestration, programming, keyboards
Panagiotis Haramis - bass
Roland Hoffman - flamenco guitar
Katerina Kiriakou - background vocals
Vaggelis Konstantinidis - lyrics
Tony Kontaxakis - remix, orchestration
Ioanna Kolokotroni - background vocals
Trifon Koutsourelis - orchestration, programming, keyboards, extra programming
Alex Leon - orchestration, programming, keyboards
Lilian - background vocals
Eleana Papaioannou - background vocals
Grigoris Petrakos - background vocals
Phoebus - music, lyrics, orchestration, programming, keyboards
Vasilis Tassopoulos - percussion
Aspa Tsina - background vocals
Fotini Tsitsigkou - background vocals
Despina Vandi - vocals

Production
Vaggelis Siapatis - sound, computer editing
Giorgos Stampolis - sound, computer editing
Nikos Stavropoulos - sound engineer
Manolis Vlahos - sound, mixing

Design
C. Coutayar - cover photo
Panos Kallitsis - make up, hair
Dimitris Panoulis - photo show

Credits adapted from the album's liner notes.

Official remixes
2003: Thimisou (Remix by Nikos Halkousis - G. Koutsouflakis)
2007: Thimisou (Soumka Mix)
2007: I Melodia Tis Monaxias (Soumka Loneliness Mix)

Cover versions
2004: Despina Vandi - C'est La Vie (Simera) (Σήμερα)
2006: Cristina Rus - Viaţa Mea (Σήμερα; My life) (Romania)
2006: Lana Jurčević - Odlaziš (Σήμερα) (Croatia)

References

External links
Official site

2002 EPs
Greek-language songs
Albums produced by Phoebus (songwriter)
Despina Vandi EPs